Alexander Kasimovich Kazembek ( or ; Azerbaijani: Aleksandr Kazımbəy or Mirzə Kazım-bəy; Persian: میرزا کاظم بیگ Mirzâ Kâzem Beg) (22 July 1802 – 27 November 1870), born Muhammad Ali Kazim-bey (Azeri: Məhəmməd Əli Kazımbəy), was an orientalist, historian and philologist. He was the great-grandfather and namesake of the Mladorossi founder Alexander Kazembek.

The Cambridge History of Russia refers to him as "a Dagestani Persian of Shi‘i origin", whereas the Archival Collections of Columbia University Libraries refers to his great-grandson as born "into an old noble family of Persian (Azeri) origin". Robert P. Geraci refers to Kasimovich Kazembek as "an Azeri who converted to Christianity", whereas Brill's Christian-Muslim Relations series refers to him as born "to a prominent Iranian family from the Caucasus", whose father was an "Azerbaijani Muslim cleric".

Background
Alexander Kazembek's grandfather had settled in Derbent during the campaigns of Nader Shah (1736-1747), the Shah of Afsharid Iran. There, he had become the paymaster general of the Derbent Khanate. Kazembek's father, a Muslim cleric known by the name of Mirza Mohammad Qasim (also known as Hajji Kazim), was born in Derbent when the city had been taken by the Quba Khanate. On his way back from pilgrimage to Mecca (hajj), he settled in Rasht in Gilan Province after marrying the daughter of the town's governor.

Life
Kazembek was born in Rasht in 1802. He was born in a time of political upheaval as Russia was expanding into Iran's territories in the Caucasus. His childhood thus coincided with the Russo-Persian War (1804-1813). During this war, Derbent was annexed by the Russians. Kazembek's family stayed in Rasht until 1811, when they moved back to Derbent. There, Kazembek's father was appointed chief judge by the Tsarist authorities. However, shortly after, he was accused of being an Iranian spy. He was subsequently sent into exile in Astrakhan.

Kazembek completed his studies in Islam and, already fluent in Azeri and Persian, also excelled in Russian, Turkish and Arabic. At the age of 17, he wrote his first book named Topics in Grammar of the Arabic Language (originally in Arabic). His father wanted him to become a Muslim scholar and was going to send him away to Persia and Arabia to master Islamic studies. However, in 1820, Muhammad Qasim Kazim-bey was charged with espionage on behalf of Persia, deprived of his religious title and exiled to Astrakhan along with his wife.

Religious views
While residing in Derbent, young Kazembek often met with Scottish Presbyterian missionaries. They would have long discussions during which he, then a devout Muslim, would try to "undeceive" his opponents. However, these discussions led to Kazembek's frequent inquiries about the principles of Christianity. He started studying Hebrew and English in order to have access to more information on this subject. In 1821, Kazembek visited his father in Astrakhan to arrange his own enrollment into foreign Islamic schools. There he once again came across missionaries and, after grave cogitation, he converted to Christianity. This resulted in conflict with his parents, who never came around to his decision. Despite this fact, Kazembek was later one of the few European scholars who strongly disagreed with the view that Islam was an obstacle to social development—a stance which was common among Westerners in the nineteenth century.

Career as a historian
Kazembek was an author of several historical books. He wrote Assab as-Sayyar (Seven Planets) on the history of the Crimean khans from 1466 to 1737 (in Turkish) and The Study of the Uyghur on Ancient Uyghurs in 1841. He also translated Muhammad Avabi's Darband-nameh (17th century book on the history of Daghestan) into English and published it in 1850. His biggest historical work was Báb and the Bábis: Religious and Political Unrest in Persia in 1848-1852, which he published in 1865. His other works were mostly focused on Islamic studies: Concordance of the Koran (1859), Muridism and Shamil (1859), History of Islam (1860), etc.

Career as a philologist
Kazembek started his career as a linguist by translating Christian books into Oriental languages. In addition to the languages he already knew, he learned French, German and Tatar. In 1825, he received an invitation to complete his bachelor's degree in London. However the Russian government refused to let him out of the country, fearing that Kazembek would choose to stay and work in England upon graduation. Instead by Imperial decree he was appointed as a teacher of the Tatar language in Omsk, thus being held away from his academic instructors. He never made it to Omsk as, while staying in Kazan due to an illness, Kazembek met historian Karl Fuchs and was invited by him to pass an academic test to determine Kazembek's eligibility to teach Arabic and Persian at Kazan University. The test was passed and Kazembek was hired as a senior teacher. In 1828, he was chosen to be a member of the Royal Asiatic Society and became head of the newly established Faculty of Turkic languages at Kazan University. In 1831, he attained a master's degree after writing an academic essay called Views on the History and Vocabulary of the Arabic Language (in Persian). In 1835 he was admitted to the Russian Academy of Sciences as a Corresponding Member. In 1837, he earned a Ph.D. degree at Kazan University. In 1839, he wrote a detailed work called Grammar of the Turco-Tatar language (at that time, most Turkic languages were regarded as dialects of one single language unit often referred to as 'Tatar' or 'Turco-Tatar'), where he compared Ottoman Turkish, Azerbaijani and various dialects of Tatar in terms of their phonology, morphology, and syntax and for which he received the Demidov Prize. The second edition of this book was published in 1846 and incorporated the author's latest research in the field. It became popular in Western Europe, being the richest academic source on the Turkic languages at that time, and was used in universities as a primary reference book until 1921, when Jean Deny published his Grammar of the Turkish language (Ottoman dialect).

In 1849, Kazembek was transferred to St. Petersburg University, which by his initiative was reorganized into the main Russian post-secondary institution for studying Oriental languages. In 1855, he became dean of the newly formed faculty. In 1863, he secured the establishment of the Department of Oriental History. He organized internships for students who showed interest in field studies of Oriental cultures. In 1854, he published another linguistic work named Study Manual for Turkish Language Courses, which included several reading materials typed in various scripts, and a Russian-Turkish dictionary of 6,700 words (the richest one at the time). That same year, he also published The Explanation of the Russian Words Similar to Those in Oriental Languages, a major work on loanwords in the Russian language.

In 1868, Kazembek initiated an academic movement aimed at studying the linguistics, ethnography, numismatics, and epigraphy of Turkestan. Unfortunately, with his death, this idea was mostly abandoned.

Other works
 Resaleh-ye haqiqat-nameh
 Resaleh-ye Mohammad Ali be qazi-e Khiveh
 Resaleh dar javab-e Eshbat-e nobovvat-e khasse-ye Molla Mohammad Reza Hamedani

References

Azerbaijani philologists
Russian philologists
Iranian Azerbaijanis
Linguists from Iran
Linguists from the Russian Empire
Azerbaijani orientalists
Russian orientalists
Demidov Prize laureates
Corresponding members of the Saint Petersburg Academy of Sciences
Kazan Federal University alumni
Academic staff of Kazan Federal University
Academic staff of Saint Petersburg State University
Converts to Protestantism from Shia Islam
Russian former Muslims
Muslims from the Russian Empire
Azerbaijani former Shia Muslims
Iranian former Shia Muslims
Russian Presbyterians
Presbyterians from the Russian Empire
Azerbaijani Presbyterians
Iranian Presbyterians
Russian people of Iranian descent
1802 births
1870 deaths
People from Rasht
Iranian orientalists
19th-century Iranian people
19th-century Persian-language writers